Buzek (Czech feminine: Buzková) is a surname. It may refer to:
 Agata Buzek (born 1976), Polish actress
 Hans Buzek (born 1938), Austrian footballer
 Ivana Buzková (born 1985), Czech figure skater
 Jan Buzek (1874–1940), Polish politician
 Jerzy Buzek (born 1940), Polish politician
 Józef Buzek (1873–1936), Polish economist
 Miloslav Buzek (1899–1940), Czech equestrian
 Petr Buzek (born 1977), Czech ice hockey player
 Petra Buzková (born 1965), Czech politician

See also
 
 

Czech-language surnames
Polish-language surnames